Hypogastrura nivicola is a species of dark blue springtail. Its (US) English name is snow flea, but there are also insects called by that name. They are often seen jumping about on the surface of snow on a warm winter day in North America.

Researchers at Queen's University (Canada) have sequenced and synthesised the anti-freeze-like protein that allows H. nivicola to operate in sub-zero environments, and found it to be glycine-rich. There are hopes that similar proteins may be useful for storing transplant organs and for producing better ice cream. By preventing the formation of ice crystals in tissues, organs could be stored at lower temperatures, increasing the time of their viability outside a living body. Unlike proteins with similar functions in other species, the protein found in H. nivicola breaks down easily at higher temperatures.

See also 
 Snow scorpionfly - a group of insects also (Boreidae) known as snow fleas including:
 Boreus hyemalis

References

External links 
 Pictures and information from Fairfax County Public Schools

Poduromorpha
Fauna of North America
Animals described in 1846
Taxa named by Asa Fitch